Le Passage is the name of the second studio album recorded by French singer Jenifer Bartoli. It was released on June 1, 2004 and contains the hit singles "Ma Révolution" and "Le Souvenir de ce jour". It became a top three album in France and Belgium (Wallonia). Famous artists such as Marc Levy, Calogero and Kyo participated in the writing of the record.

This album allowed Jenifer to be awarded 'Best French Artist' at the MTV Europe Music Awards, on November 18, 2004. In 2005, it also won a NRJ Music Awards in the category 'Francophone Album of the Year'.

Track listing

Album credits

Barilla.design - design
Idriss El Mehdi Benani - keyboards (C'est de l'or)
Calogero - bass guitar (C'est de l'or)
Xavier Caux - programming (Le passage)
Christophe Dubois - drums & percussion (C'est de l'or)
Peter Ebrelius - viola
Tomas Ebrelius - violin
Azim Haidaryan - photography
Simon Hale - strings conducting
Andreas Karlegård - bass guitar & keyboards
Martin Karlegård - guitar
Abraham Laboriel Jr. - drums
Sandrine Le Bars - executive producer
Christoffer Lundquist - strings conducting
Olivier Marly - guitar (C'est de l'or)
Jost Nickel - drums (Le passage)
Maxim Nucci - guitar, keyboards & programming
Anna Nygrén - piano
Mikko Paavola - additional guitar
Philippe Rault - executive producer for Bastille Productions
Charlotta Weber Sjöholm - cello
Big Smith - bass guitar (Le passage)
Frank Tontoh - drums (Serre-moi & De vous à moi)
Laurent Vernerey - bass guitar

 Ma révolution, Le souvenir de ce jour, Pour toi, J'en ai assez, Comme un yoyo & Celle que tu vois
Produced by Andreas Karlegård & Martin Karlegård for KBros
Engineered by KBros at The Aerosol Grey Machine, Vollsjö, KBros Studio, Stockholm & Studio Ramsès 2, Paris
Engineered by Ken Allardyce at Westlake Audio, Los Angeles
Assistant engineer - Jason Rankins (Westlake Audio)

 C'est de l'or
Produced by Calogero & Olivier Marly
Engineered by Étienne Colin at Studio Gang, Paris
Assistant engineer - Florian Lagatta

 Ose, Serre-moi & De vous à moi
Produced by Maxim Nucci
Engineered by Jean-Paul Gonnod at Studio Plus XXX, Paris
Engineered by Stéphane Lévy-B at Studio Méga, Suresnes
Pro Tools editing by Xavier Caux

 Le passage
Produced by Maxim Nucci & Big Smith
Engineered by Mickaël Rangeard at Studio Plus XXX
Assistant engineer - Mathias Froidefond

 
Produced by Andreas Karlegård, Martin Karlegård & Maxim Nucci
Engineered by KBros at KBros Studio
Engineered by Jean-Paul Gonnod at Studio Plus XXX
Engineered by Stéphane Lévy-B at Studio Méga

Artistic direction - Bertrand Lamblot
Assistant - Alexandra Cubizolles
Mixed by Bob Clearmountain at Mix This!, Pacific Palisades
Assistant mixing: Kevin Harp
Mastered by Miles Showell at Metropolis Mastering, London

Charts

Peak positions

Year-end charts

Certifications

References

2004 albums
Jenifer (singer) albums